Stoppit and Tidyup was a British children's animated cartoon television series produced by CMTB Animation and Queensgate Productions in 1987 and screened on BBC One with repeats on BBC Two from 12 September to 5 December 1988. The episodes feature two protagonists, Stoppit and Tidyup, interacting with various other inhabitants of the mythical land of Do As You're Told. Each episode was five minutes in length, and narrated by Terry Wogan. The series was created by Charles Mills and Terry Brain (who had previously created the claymation series The Trap Door in 1984), and partly funded by The Tidy Britain Group. The third member of the team behind the show was animator Steve Box who later gained success after moving to Aardman Animations.

The introduction theme music to Stoppit and Tidyup's friends coming along the screen at the start of each episode was "Follow the Leader" by Bobby Hunter, Eric Peters and Robert Hunter from the Spectrum mood library.

Description 
The short-running series features microscopic characters who live in the fictitious land of "Do As You're Told", a strange and colourful place (that was not completely separate from the human world, as one episode features a busy road and another features children playing) whose inhabitants are bugs named after orders directed at children by their parents. Unlike The Trap Door, which ran for 40 episodes over two series, only a single series of thirteen episodes was produced. Each episode is named after a character that features in the episode (however, the character "Not Now" did not have an episode named after him because he was the pet of the series' antagonist "I Said No").

The series followed the exploits of the eponymous Stoppit (a red bug of fluff with arms and legs), and Tidyup (a blue-haired, necktie-wearing purple bug who is shaped like a bowling pin), in their native land, which is filled with giant-to-them gherkins. Supporting characters include Beequiet and Beehave (two, as their names suggest, bees, the former of whom is huge and has a pursed-up mouth, but the latter is much smaller than him and does not, and they both have a mop of red hair at the top of their heads), Eat Your Greens (a blue-haired, green frog-like bug), Comb Your Hair (a blue cow-like spider with long orange hair and a bell round his neck), Wash Your Face (a Wellington boot-wearing bug without arms who usually appears brown with black boots, but a bath revealed him to be pink with yellow boots), Go And Play (a light green bug who wore shorts and trainers), the big bad I Said No (an angry red bug who has a pink pet dog-like one called Not Now), Hurry Up (a flying bug of red and yellow scribbles), Calm Down (a yellow bug with a blue umbrella), Don't Do That (a red bug who lives in a shell), Go To Bed (a tired, pink-haired white bug), Sayplease and Saythankyou (a two-faced plant-like bug), Clean Your Teeth (a purple-haired, sunglasses-wearing orange bug with huge teeth), and Take Care (a flying blue kangaroo-like bug). There are also groups of extra characters referred to as Naughties (who are purple with yellow spots, and will cause "Naughtypox" when touched) and Sit Downs (who are pink and have magic powers that can cure Naughtypox). None of the characters actually speak decipherable words as such. Instead they gabble, grunt, squeak, and hum whilst series narrator Terry Wogan unravels the tale for viewers. The characters' noises were provided by the show's co-creator Terry Brain but he was not credited for it.

The storylines are notable for their random, abstract nature, and the fact that an episode will frequently end without any moral message at all. For example, in the twelfth episode, "Clean Your Teeth", it begins to snow in the middle of summer, and Stoppit gets left behind on his own while Tidyup and Clean Your Teeth spend the rest of the episode playing on sledges at the end, even though he loves the snow.

Production 
Unlike its predecessor, Stoppit and Tidyup was cel-animated, and while a single episode of The Trap Door would take Charles Mills and Terry Brain an average of two weeks to write, build and shoot in 1984, a single episode of this series would only take them an average of ten days to write and film in 1987. After the series concluded, they mainly did commercials and title sequences.

Media 
A series of twelve tie-in books were published by Price Stern Sloan Ltd. when the series was first aired in 1988, and an illustrated annual was released in 1989. All thirteen episodes were released on VHS by BBC Video (BBCV 4207) in that same year, but this is now out of print (it also segued them together, and dubbed over Wogan's opening lines for all except the first episode with the first few seconds of the theme song). All thirteen episodes were later rereleased on DVD by Universal Pictures in 2004.

Episode guide and character titles 
All thirteen episodes featuring Stoppit & Tidyup's friends were shown on BBC One and repeated on BBC Two as part of the Children's BBC strand, as it was known before 1997, on Mondays at 3:50pm.

Credits 
Narrated by: Terry Wogan
Animation: Charles Mills, Terry Brain, Steve Box
Editing: Rob Copeland
Dubbing: Glentham Studios
Produced by: John Howson
Devised and created by: CMTB Animation
© CMTB Animation/Queensgate Productions 1987

See also 
The Trap Door (also created by Charles Mills and Terry Brain)

References

External links 

Stoppit and Tidyup at Toonhound
Stoppit and Tidyup at '80s Cartoons
Stoppit and Tidyup at Jedi's Paradise (archived on 17 December 2005 by the Wayback Machine)

BBC children's television shows
British children's animated comedy television series
1988 British television series debuts
1988 British television series endings
Television series by Universal Television